William Thomas Poague (December 20, 1835 – September 8, 1914) was a Confederate States Army officer serving in the Artillery during the American Civil War. He later served as Treasurer of Virginia Military Institute.

Early life
Born in Rockbridge County, Virginia to John Barclay and Elizabeth Stuart Paxton Poague, Poague attended and graduated from Washington College where he was a member of the Virginia Beta Chapter of Phi Kappa Psi. Poague was practicing law in St. Joseph, Missouri when the Civil War began.

Civil War

Poague returned to Virginia, and entered the Confederate Army as a second lieutenant in the famous Rockbridge Virginia Artillery. Poague was promoted to be that unit's captain by April 1862. With the battery, Poague fought at the battles of First Manassas, Romney, Kernstown, McDowell, and later with the Army of Northern Virginia in the Seven Days Battles, the Battle of Cedar Mountain, Second Manassas, the Battle of Harper's Ferry, Antietam, and Fredericksburg. Poague was promoted to major on March 2, 1863. He served as an executive officer to David G. McIntosh at the Battle of Chancellorsville, then was given his own battalion upon the formation of the Third Corps.

Poague commanded the battalion at Gettysburg, the Battle of Bristoe Station, the Battle of Mine Run, the Wilderness, the Spotsylvania, the North Anna, and Cold Harbor. Poague's best service to the Confederacy probably occurred at the Wilderness. Poague's battalion was able to hold off Winfield S. Hancock's II Corps on the morning of the second day, firing over the heads of wounded Confederates, long enough for Lt. Gen. James Longstreet to arrive and "save the day." Lt. Gen. A.P. Hill turned to Poague, firing double charges, because things were so desperate that it could not be even delayed to allow wounded Confederates to get out of the way. Hill himself helped man Poague's guns. He was wounded twice at the Battle of Cold Harbor. Poague later took part in the defense of Petersburg, finally surrendering at the Battle of Appomattox Court House.

Post War career, death and legacy
After the War, Poague worked as a farmer, teacher, and lawyer. He represented Rockbridge County in the Virginia House of Delegates. He served Washington College, later Washington and Lee University as a Trustee from 1865 to 1885. He served as the treasurer of the Virginia Military Institute under superintendents Francis H. Smith and Battle of New Market hero Scott Shipp from 1884 until his death on September 8, 1914. He also served as Secretary of the Board of Visitors for VMI. He wrote a set of memoirs entitled Gunner With Stonewall. Poague's papers are collected at VMI. Poague is buried at Oak Grove Cemetery in Lexington, Virginia.

Notes

References
Web biography from And Then A.P. Hill Came Up.
Poague, William Thomas. Gunner with Stonewall:Reminiscences of William Thomas Poague, Bison Books, 1991,

External links

Confederate States Army officers
1835 births
1914 deaths
People of Virginia in the American Civil War
Washington and Lee University alumni